If You Love Me may refer to:

Albums
 If You Love Me, by Dorothy Squires, 2008
 If You Love me, by Nana Mouskouri, 1974
 If You Love Me by Richard Galliano, 2007
 If You Love Me / Si tu m'ami: 18th-Century Italian Songs by Cecilia Bartoli and György Fischer, 1992

Songs
 "If You Love Me (Really Love Me)", the English language version of the Édith Piaf song "Hymne à l'amour"
 "If You Love Me" (Brownstone song), 1994
 "If You Love Me" (Lizzo song), 2022
 "If You Love Me" (Mint Condition song), 1999
 "If You Love Me" (Ted Hawkins song), 1992
 "If You Love Me", 2012 single by Lil' Kim
 "If You Love Me", 1982 single by Ron François
 "If You Love Me (Let Me Know)", 1974 single by Olivia Newton-John
 "If You Love Me?", a 2007 song by Mary J. Blige from Growing Pains

See also
 If Ye Love Me, a four-part motet or anthem by Thomas Tallis
 If You Really Love Me, a 1971 song by Stevie Wonder